Dewayne E. Perry is an American engineer. He was formerly the Motorola Regents Chair at the University of Texas at Austin. He is a member of the IEEE Computer Society and SIGSOFT. He is the co-author, with Alexander L. Wolf, of the most-cited paper in software engineering since 1999.

Personal life 
Over the past decades, Perry and his wife, Faith, have assembled a world-class collection of medieval and Renaissance prints, etchings, woodcuts, and engravings.

References

Year of birth missing (living people)
Living people
University of Texas at Austin faculty
21st-century American engineers